OrSiSo is a Singapore registered online lifestream management/real-time internet startup (2007) and has been funded thus far by experienced technology business angels and with the support of the Singapore government IDM grants program.

OrSiSo helps to merge friends' contact information from multiple networks into a single profile, making it easy to manage conversations with people who are active across different networks. To help keep on top of the constant stream of updates and information from various sources, the service provides a unique filtering mechanism: SocialCraft, which allows the user to filter notifications from his or her friends and prioritize information from those who are "closer" to the user.

The OrSiSo application runs on Adobe AIR, and connects to several social networks including Twitter, Facebook, LinkedIn, Bebo and Flickr as well as Yahoo!, AIM, ICQ and MSN chats.

It competes with other services such as Friendfeed, Seeismic Desktop, Tweetdeck, Power.com, Peoplebrwsr, Digsby, Skimmer,...

It won the Singapore MobileMonday Peer Awards for best mobile startup in 2009.

Supported services 
Twitter, Facebook, LinkedIn, Bebo, Friendster and Flickr as well as AIM, ICQ, MSN, Gtalk and Facebook chats

Sources
Videos
http://mis-asia.com/multimedia/nested-content/right-video?/__data/assets/file/0005/154868/Orsiso-video_part-1.flv	
https://www.youtube.com/watch?v=kGWgPlg6-Sc

Articles
https://web.archive.org/web/20090408220954/http://www.mis-asia.com/news/articles/orsiso-wins-award-for-best-startup
http://sgentrepreneurs.com/interviews/2009/04/09/in-conversations-with-thorben-linneberg-orsiso-aureliant
http://www.monstersandcritics.com/tech/features/article_1484797.php/Getting_the_most_out_of_Twitter
http://www.youngupstarts.com/2009/04/13/orsisocom-helps-you-organize-your-virtual-life/
http://www.youngupstarts.com/2009/05/24/the-startups-that-rocked-unconference-2009/
http://www.youngupstarts.com/2009/06/20/singapore-startups-at-communicasia-2009/

External links
Official Website
IT Companies In Singapore

Information technology companies of Singapore